Ifti Nasim (1946 – July 22, 2011) was a gay Pakistani American poet.  Having moved to the United States to escape persecution for his sexual orientation, he became known locally for establishing Sangat, an organization to support LGBT south-Asian youths, and internationally for publishing Narman, a poetry collection that was the first open expression of homosexual themes in the Urdu language. Nasim was inducted into the Chicago Gay and Lesbian Hall of Fame in 1996.

Personal life

Nasim was born in Faisalabad, Pakistan (then called Lyallpur) shortly before independence, a middle child in a large family.  As a teenager he felt ostracized and alone, and was unable to live as openly gay; at the age of 21 he emigrated from Pakistan to the US, inspired in part by an article in Life magazine that he recalls describing the US as "the place for gays to be in".  Several of his siblings later followed him to the US, and he eventually naturalized as a US citizen.

Ifti Nasim died in hospital in Chicago on July 22, 2011 following a heart attack, at the age of 64.

Poetry

The publication for which Ifti Nasim was best known was a book of poetry entitled Narman, a word meaning "hermaphrodite" or "half-man, half-woman" in Persian.  It met immediate controversy in Pakistan and had to be distributed underground; even the printer of the book, belatedly realizing its contents, was reported to shout, "Take these unholy and dirty books away from me, or I'll set them on fire!"  However, its frankness inspired a younger generation of Pakistani poets to write "honest" poetry, a genre becoming known as "narmani" poetry.

He later released Myrmecophile in 2000, and Abdoz in 2005.

References

1946 births
American writers of Pakistani descent
Pakistani gay writers
Pakistani LGBT poets
Pakistani male poets
Pakistani emigrants to the United States
People from Faisalabad
American gay writers
2011 deaths
American LGBT poets
20th-century American poets
American male poets
American LGBT people of Asian descent
20th-century American male writers
Gay poets